Cypress Bayou is the name applied to a series of wetlands at the western edge of Caddo Lake, in and around Jefferson, Texas, making up part of the largest Cypress forest in the world. The bayou is divided into three areas—each part of the watershed of a small river or creek—Little Cypress, Big  Cypress, and Black Cypress. The features had been modified, to an extent, by human beings in the 19th and 20th centuries, but today is endangered by pollution, development, and the deforestation, through clear cutting, of the Piney Woods that surround the bayous. Large groves of trees have completely died off, and land has been recently deforested up to the water's edge.

See also

List of rivers of Texas

References

External links

Wetlands of Texas
Jefferson, Texas
Rivers of Marion County, Texas
Rivers of Texas
Tributaries of the Red River of the South